SV Eintracht Lollar is a German football club based in Lollar, Hesse, currently playing in the Gruppenliga Gießen/Marburg (VII). The club, with 550 active members, also has departments for women's football, gymnastics and nordic walking.

History 
SV Eintracht Lollar were established in 1920 and their football team twice earned promotion to the sixth tier Verbandsliga Hessen-Mitte, in 2007 and 2010 but was, on both occasions, relegated straight away again. The club achieved another promotion to the Verbandsliga in 2012 but was immediately relegated again.

Stadium 
SV Eintracht Lollar plays its home fixtures at the 6,000 capacity Waldsportplatz.

External links 
 SV Eintracht Lollar 

Football clubs in Germany
Football clubs in Hesse
Association football clubs established in 1920
1920 establishments in Germany